The 28th Utah Senate District is located in Beaver County, Utah, Garfield, Iron, Kane, Millard and Washington Counties and includes Utah House Districts 68, 69, 71, 72 and 73. The current State Senator representing the 28th district is Evan Vickers. Vickers was elected to the Utah Senate in 2012.

Previous Utah State Senators (District 28)

Election results

2006 General Election

See also
 Dennis E. Stowell
 Utah Democratic Party
 Utah Republican Party
 Utah Senate

External links
 Utah Senate District Profiles
 Official Biography of Dennis E. Stowell

28
Beaver County, Utah
Garfield County, Utah
Iron County, Utah
Kane County, Utah
Millard County, Utah
Washington County, Utah